Boris Nikolayevich Popovich (1896–1943) was an association football player.

International career
Popovich played his only game for Russia on July 12, 1914 in a friendly against Norway.

External links
  Profile

1896 births
1943 deaths
Russian footballers
Russia international footballers

Association football midfielders